China Academy of Aerospace Aerodynamics or CAAA (in Chinese: 中国航天空气动力技术研究院) is a research and manufacturing organization for rockets, missiles and unmanned aerial vehicles (UAVs). Headquartered in Beijing, China, it is a subsidiary of China Aerospace Science and Technology Corporation (CASC).

Activity 
CAAA produces the popular China's military export Rainbow UAVs, as well as the PW UAVs.

History 
Founded in 1956, CAAA was formerly known as Beijing Institute of Aerodynamics (BIA) and 701st Institute of CASC. Nowadays, it is also known as the 11th Academy of CASC.

See also 
 China Aerospace Science and Technology Corporation (CASC)
 List of unmanned aerial vehicles of the People's Republic of China

References

External links 
 Official website

Aerospace companies
Research institutes in China